Discodorididae is a taxonomic family of sea slugs, specifically dorid nudibranchs, marine gastropod mollusks in the superfamily Doridoidea.

Species in this family belong to the cryptobranch dorid nudibranchs, i.e. they are able to retract their gills into a gill pocket (cryptobranch = hidden gills). Most are small and hard to identify. Most are thought to feed at night on sponges, while during the day they search for dark areas or remain hidden under rocks.

One example of a discodoridid is the "Pacific sea lemon" or "speckled sea lemon", Peltodoris nobilis, which occurs off the coast of British Columbia to Baja California from low-tide waters to a depth of about 200 m. Not only is this species yellow with a bumpy surface, but it also gives off a strong fruity citrus smell when handled, adding to its resemblance to a lemon.

Genera
Genera within the family Discodorididae include:
 Alloiodoris Bergh, 1904
 Aporodoris Ihering, 1886
 Asteronotus Ehrenberg, 1831
 Atagema Gray, 1850
 Baptodoris  Bergh, 1884  
 Carminodoris Bergh, 1889 
 Diaulula Bergh, 1878
 Dictyodoris Bergh, 1880
 Discodoris Bergh, 1877 - the type genus
 Gargamella Bergh, 1894
 Geitodoris  Bergh, 1892  
 Gravieria Vayssiere, 1912
 Halgerda Bergh, 1880
 Hiatodoris Dayrat, 2010
 Hoplodoris Bergh, 1880 - synonym: Carminodoris Bergh, 1889
 Jorunna  Bergh, 1876  
 Nirva Bergh, 1905
 Nophodoris Valdés & Gosliner, 2001
 Paradoris Ortea, 1995 
 Peltodoris Bergh, 1880
 Platydoris  Bergh, 1877  
 Rostanga  Bergh, 1879  
 Sclerodoris Eliot, 1904
 Sebadoris Er. Marcus & Ev. Marcus, 1960
 Taringa Er. Marcus, 1955
 Tayuva Er. Marcus & Ev. Marcus, 1967
 Thordisa Bergh, 1877 
 Thorybopus Bouchet, 1977

Genera brought into synonymy
 Adura [sic]: synonym of Audura Bergh, 1878: synonym of Jorunna Bergh, 1876
 Anisodoris Bergh, 1898: synonym of Diaulula Bergh, 1878
 Ansiodoris [sic]: synonym of Anisodoris Bergh, 1898: synonym of Diaulula Bergh, 1878
 Argus Bohadsch, 1761: synonym of Platydoris Bergh, 1877
 Audura Bergh, 1878 : synonym of Jorunna Bergh, 1876
 Awuka Er. Marcus, 1955 : synonym of Jorunna Bergh, 1876
 Boreodoris Odhner, 1939 : synonym of Rostanga Bergh, 1879
 Carryodoris Vayssière, 1919: synonym of Geitodoris Bergh, 1891
 Centrodoris P. Fischer, 1883 : synonym of Kentrodoris Bergh, 1874
 Discodorididae aliciae Dayrat, 2005: synonym of “Montereina” aliciae (Dayrat, 2005)
 Erythrodoris Pruvot-Fol, 1933: synonym of Discodoris Bergh, 1877
 Fracassa Bergh, 1878: synonym of Discodoris Bergh, 1877
 Glossodoridiformia O'Donoghue, 1927: synonym of Atagema Gray, 1850
 Kentrodoris Bergh, 1874 : synonym of Jorunna Bergh, 1876
 Montereina MacFarland, 1905: synonym of Peltodoris Bergh, 1880
 Otinodoris White, 1948 : synonym of Asteronotus Ehrenberg, 1831
 Peronodoris Bergh, 1904: synonym of Sclerodoris Eliot, 1904
 Petelodoris Bergh, 1882: synonym of Atagema Gray, 1850
 Phialodoris Bergh, 1890 : synonym of Peltodoris Bergh, 1880
 Phlegmodoris Bergh, 1878: synonym of Atagema Gray, 1850
 Pupsikus Er. Marcus & Ev. Marcus, 1970: synonym of Thordisa Bergh, 1877
 Trippa (gastropod)|Trippa Bergh, 1877 : synonym of Atagema Gray, 1850
 Tumbia Burn, 1962: synonym of Sclerodoris Eliot, 1904

See also 
 Dorididae, also known as Sea lemon.

References

External links 

http://www.helsinki.fi/~mhaaramo/metazoa/protostoma/mollusca/Gastropoda/Opisthobranchia/Discodorididae.htm
 Dayrat B. & Gosliner T. M. (2005). "Species names and metaphyly: a case study in Discodorididae (Mollusca, Gastropoda, Euthyneura, Nudibranchia, Doridina)". Zoologica Scripta 34: 199-224. .
 Valdés Á. (2002). A phylogenetic analysis and systematic revision of the cryptobranch dorids (Mollusca, Nudibranchia, Anthobranchia). Zoological Journal of the Linnean Society 136: 535-636
  Dayrat B. 2010. A monographic revision of discodorid sea slugs (Gastropoda, Opisthobranchia, Nudibranchia, Doridina). Proceedings of the California Academy of Sciences, Series 4, vol. 61, suppl. I, 1-403, 382 figs.